Elections were held in Alabama on Tuesday, November 2, 2010. Primary elections were held on June 1, 2010, with the run-off on July 13.

The elections were historic for the Republican Party, in that it captured the majority of both chambers of the Alabama Legislature for the first time in 136 years.  The Republican Party also swept all statewide races on the 2010 ballot.

Federal

United States Senate 

The nominees were incumbent Richard Shelby (Republican Party) and attorney William G. Barnes (Democratic Party).

United States House 

All seven Alabama seats in the United States House of Representatives were up for election in 2010.

State

Governor
Incumbent Governor Bob Riley was ineligible for re-election due to term limits.

Lieutenant Governor

Secretary of State 
Incumbent Secretary of State Beth Chapman was successful in her bid for a second term.

Attorney General 
Incumbent Attorney General Troy King lost his re-election bid in the GOP primary.

State Treasurer 
Incumbent Treasurer Kay Ivey did not seek re-election, instead successfully running for Lieutenant Governor.

Auditor

Commissioner of Agriculture & Industries

Public Service Commissioner

State Board of Education

State Senate

All 35 seats of the Alabama Senate were up for election in 2010.

Prior to the election the Democrats held a 20–14 edge; after the election the GOP captured control 22–12 (one seat vacant).

State House of Representatives

All 105 seats in the Alabama House of Representatives were up for election in 2010.

Prior to the election the Democrats had a 60–44 edge; after the election the GOP took control 62–42 (one seat vacant).

Judicial positions
Multiple judicial positions will be up for election in 2010.
Alabama judicial elections, 2010 at Judgepedia

Supreme Court

Civil Appeals Court

Ballot measures
Two measures have been certified for the 2010 statewide election. The propane gas amendment on the Jun 1 ballot failed, and the Blount County sales tax measure will be on the November 2 ballot.
All four of the measures on the November 2 ballot failed.
Alabama 2010 ballot measures at Ballotpedia

Local
Many elections for county offices were also held on November 2, 2010.

References

Primary election results from AL.com
Runoff election results from MSNBC

External links
Elections from the Alabama Secretary of State
Candidates for Alabama State Offices at Project Vote Smart
Alabama Candidate List at Imagine Election - Search for candidates by address or zip code
Alabama Polls at Pollster.com

Finance
2010 House and Senate Campaign Finance for Alabama at the Federal Election Commission
Alabama Congressional Races in 2010 campaign finance data from OpenSecrets
Alabama 2010 campaign finance data from Follow the Money
Media
Alabama and National Elections at AL.com

 
Alabama
Alabama elections by year